Johnny Lyndell Hector (born November 26, 1960) is a former professional American football player who was selected by the New York Jets in the second round of the 1983 NFL Draft. A , 200 lb running back from Texas A&M, Hector played 10 NFL seasons for the New York Jets from 1983 to 1992. Hector's best season as a pro came during the 1987 season when he was tied with Charles White for most rushing touchdowns in the league with 11. During the mid to late 1980s, he served as a member of the 'Two-Headed Monster' backfield along with Freeman McNeil, creating a one-two punch at running back among the most potent in the league.

Hector compiled 4,280 rushing yards on 1,051 carries and 41 touchdowns; he also caught 188 passes for 1,661 yards and three touchdowns.  His last NFL touchdown was against the New England Patriots on December 23, 1990.

He played high school football at New Iberia Senior High School in New Iberia, Louisiana and graduated in 1979.
He now lives in Lafayette, Louisiana with his wife, Karla.

References

1960 births
Living people
Sportspeople from Lafayette, Louisiana
American football running backs
Texas A&M Aggies football players
New York Jets players